Pool A of the 2015 Cricket World Cup took place from 14 February to 14 March 2015. The group consisted of co-hosts Australia and New Zealand, and along with them, England, Sri Lanka, Bangladesh, Afghanistan and Scotland. This phase of the tournament was played as a full round-robin between all seven teams, with the top four teams, New Zealand, Australia, Sri Lanka and Bangladesh, advancing to the quarter-finals.

Standings
  Advanced to knockout stage.

Matches

New Zealand vs Sri Lanka

The opening game of the 2015 Cricket World Cup saw hosts New Zealand playing Sri Lanka. Sri Lanka won the toss and elected to field. Kumar Sangakkara (SL) moved into second place in the list of players with the most runs in ODI matches, overtaking Ricky Ponting (Aus).

Australia vs England

Australia were put in to bat by England who won the toss. After opener Aaron Finch was dropped in the first over without having scored, Australia raced away to 52, before David Warner and Shane Watson were dismissed off consecutive balls in the eighth over. In the 11th over, the dismissal of Steve Smith left Australia at 70/3. Captain George Bailey then joined Finch and the two added 146 runs in 26 overs for the fourth wicket. Finch was run out for 135 and soon Bailey was also sent back for 55. Glenn Maxwell and Mitchell Marsh then put on 53 runs in 7 overs for the sixth wicket before Marsh fell and the Australian score read 281/6 in the 46th over. Brad Haddin came into bat at 9 and shared a partnership of 61 runs off just 27 balls with Maxwell. In the final over of the innings, Steven Finn removed Haddin for a 14-ball 31 and Maxwell for a 40-ball 66 off consecutive balls. Finn completed the hat-trick getting the wicket of Mitchell Johnson off the final ball, and Australia finished at 342/9.

England's chase started with Mitchell Starc breaking the opening stand of 25, following which Marsh picked the next five wickets. England were reduced to 92/6, before James Taylor and Chris Woakes steadied the innings with a 92-run partnership. After Woakes fell for 37, Australia picked two more wickets off consecutive overs. From 195/9, England could add 36 runs for the last wicket before a controversial run out ended their innings. Taylor remained unbeaten on 98 as Australia secured a 111-run victory. Finch won the Man of the Match award for his knock.

New Zealand vs Scotland

New Zealand captain Brendon McCullum won the toss and put Scotland in to bat. Trent Boult and Tim Southee picked up two wickets each within the first five overs of the innings which left Scotland at 12/4. Both Matt Machan and Richie Berrington then scored fifties before being dismissed by Corey Anderson. Scotland's lower order offered little resistance and their innings ended in 36.2 overs at 142. Anderson and Daniel Vettori picked 3 wickets each for New Zealand.

In reply, New Zealand lost wickets at regular intervals from the start and were 66/3 in the 11th over. Kane Williamson and Grant Elliott put on 40 runs for the fourth wicket, before Williamson fell for 38. Scotland picked another three wickets in quick time to leave New Zealand 137/7 in the 24th over. Vettori scored an unbeaten 8 from 4 balls and New Zealand went on to win the match by 3 wickets. Boult was awarded the Man of the Match for his bowling figures of 6-1-21-2 in Scotland's innings.

Afghanistan vs Bangladesh

New Zealand vs England

England captain Eoin Morgan, after winning the toss, elected to bat first. England were bowled out for 123 in the 34th over, having lost their last seven wickets for 19 runs in eight overs. New Zealand fast bowler Tim Southee picked up 7/33 in his 9 overs, which was the third-best haul in World Cup history. Joe Root, who scored 46, was the only England batsman to show some resilience.

New Zealand's chase got off to a brisk start, mainly due to their captain Brendon McCullum who scored the fastest World Cup fifty reaching the landmark in just 18 balls. New Zealand had made 105 in 7 overs without losing a wicket. McCullum was dismissed off the first ball of the eighth over for 77, and the other opener, Martin Guptill also fell to the bowling of Chris Woakes in the tenth over. New Zealand consolidated the innings following this and went on to win the game by 8 wickets with more than 37 overs to spare. Southee won the Man of the Match for his bowling efforts.

Australia vs Bangladesh

Afghanistan vs Sri Lanka

Sri Lankan captain Angelo Mathews won the toss and elected to field. Afghanistan got off to a solid start before both their openers were dismissed off consecutive overs and the score read 40/2 in the tenth over. Asghar Stanikzai and Samiullah Shenwari built a steady third-wicket partnership which was broken when Afghanistan had reached 128 in the 28th over. Following this, Afghanistan started losing wickets at regular intervals to the Sri Lankan pace bowlers before finally being bowled out for 232 in 49.4 overs. Lasith Malinga and Mathews picked 3 wickets each for Sri Lanka.

Sri Lanka's innings got off to a disastrous start as both openers fell for ducks within the second over. Then in the sixth over, they lost the wicket of Kumar Sangakkara with the score at 18/3. They slipped into further trouble when Dimuth Karunaratne was dismissed in the 12th over with the Sri Lankan total still at 51. Mahela Jayawardene and Mathews then added 126 runs for the fifth wicket. Mathews was run out for 44 and Jayawardene was dismissed soon after completing his 19th ODI hundred. Thisara Perera, who came in to bat with Sri Lanka in a precarious position of 178/6, struck an unbeaten 47 from 26 balls to guide his team to a four-wicket win with ten balls to spare. Jayawardene was awarded the Man of the Match for his innings of 100 from 120 balls.

England vs Scotland

Afghanistan vs Scotland

Bangladesh vs Sri Lanka

New Zealand vs Australia

Australian captain Michael Clarke won the toss and elected to bat first. Australia got off to a brisk start, putting up 48/1 at the end of the first five overs. However, Shane Watson and David Warner were dismissed off consecutive balls with the score at 80. This triggered a collapse, with Trent Boult picking up five wickets in the first three overs of his second spell. Australia were left struggling at 106/9 at the end of 22 overs, before Brad Haddin and Pat Cummins put on 45 runs for the 10th wicket to take the Australian total to 151.

New Zealand started off rapidly in their chase, thanks to a 21-ball fifty from their captain Brendon McCullum who took his team to 72/1 after 7 overs. Soon after, Australia fought back picking up three wickets in five deliveries. New Zealand began rebuilding with a 52-run partnership between Kane Williamson and Corey Anderson. The partnership was broken when Anderson was dismissed by Glenn Maxwell and the score read 131/5. In the next three overs, Mitchell Starc and Cummins took four more wickets between them, leaving New Zealand at 146/9 in 23 overs. With 6 runs needed from 27 overs, Williamson struck a six off the bowling of Cummins to give New Zealand a memorable one-wicket victory. Williamson ended up with an unbeaten 45 and the Man of the Match was awarded to Boult who had figures of 5/27 in his 10 overs, including three maidens. New Zealand also won the Chappell–Hadlee Trophy as a result of this win.

England vs Sri Lanka

England captain Eoin Morgan won the toss and elected for his side to bat first. The England openers started solidly, but they were reduced from 62/0 in the 10th over to 101/3 in the 21st. Joe Root and Morgan added 60 runs for the fourth wicket before the dismissal of Morgan. The fifth wicket partnership between Root and James Taylor yielded 98 runs in 11 overs. Taylor fell for 25, following which Root was also dismissed for a 108-ball 121. England were 265/6 in the 47th over, before Jos Buttler struck an unbeaten 39 in 19 balls to take the total to 309/6 at the end of 50 overs.

Sri Lankan innings began with Lahiru Thirimanne being dropped on 3. His opening partner Tillakaratne Dilshan was out for 44 immediately after their partnership had reached 100 runs. Kumar Sangakkara joined Thirimanne and the left-hand duo punished the England bowlers with each of the batsmen making hundreds. Thirimanne struck a six off the third ball of the 48th over to complete an emphatic 9-wicket victory. Thirimanne remained unbeaten on a 143-ball 139, while Sangakkara won the Man of the Match for his unbeaten 117 off just 86 balls.

Australia vs Afghanistan

Afghanistan captain Mohammad Nabi won the toss and put Australia in to bat. After losing the wicket of Aaron Finch in the third over, Australia put on a 260-run second wicket partnership between David Warner and Steve Smith, before Warner was dismissed for 178 off 133 balls. Smith and Glenn Maxwell then shared 65 runs in 32 balls for the third wicket before Smith fell five runs short of a hundred. Maxwell continued scoring at a brisk rate, but, in the 48th over, he was dismissed for a 39-ball 88. Brad Haddin scored an unbeaten 20 off 9 balls towards the end of the innings to push the Australian total to 417/6 at the end of their 50 overs, which was the highest-ever total in a World Cup match.

Afghanistan's chase was dented at regular intervals by the Australian fast bowlers. Former Afghan captain Nawroz Mangal top-scored for his team with 33 and no other batsman could go past 25. Mitchell Johnson picked up four wickets for Australia as Afghanistan were bowled out for 142 in 37.3 overs. This gave Australia a 275-run victory, the largest victory in terms of runs in a World Cup match.

Bangladesh vs Scotland

New Zealand vs Afghanistan

Australia vs Sri Lanka

Australian captain Michael Clarke won the toss and elected to bat. A shaky start in the opening, led to the fall of David Warner for 9. The shaky start from Australia continued when the other opener Finch fell for 24.

Bangladesh vs England

Scotland vs Sri Lanka

New Zealand vs Bangladesh

Afghanistan vs England

Australia vs Scotland

References

Group A, 2015 Cricket World Cup